Putyatino is a rural locality (a selo) and the administrative center of Putyatinsky District, Ryazan Oblast, Russia. Population:

References

Notes

Sources

Rural localities in Ryazan Oblast
Putyatinsky District